The history of the Knights Templar in England began when the French nobleman Hughes de Payens, the founder and Grand Master of the order of the Knights Templar, visited the country in 1128 to raise men and money for the Crusades.

History

King Henry II (1154–1189) granted the Templars land across England, including some territory by Castle Baynard on the River Fleet, where they built a round church, patterned after the Knights Templar headquarters on Temple Mount in Jerusalem. The Templar estate at Cressing Temple in Essex was one of the very earliest and largest Templar estates in England.

The Order was also given the advowson (right to nominate the clergy) of St Clement Danes.

In 1184, the Templars' headquarters was transferred to the New Temple (Temple Church) in London where once again they built a round church, this one patterned after the Church of the Holy Sepulchre in Jerusalem. It was consecrated in 1185, and became the location for initiation rituals.

1185  Hospital for Knights Templars
In 1185 a hospital granted to the Knights Templars, for the use of sick persons, was this year founded at Newark, Nottinghamshire.

An inventory by Geoffrey Fitz Stephen reveals that by 1185, the Order of the Knights Templar had extensive holdings in London, Hertfordshire, Essex, Kent, Warwickshire, Worcestershire, Salop, Oxfordshire, Cornwall, Lincolnshire and Yorkshire.  The involvement of Templars in financial matters is highlighted by Walter of Coventry's story of Gilbert de Ogrestan, the Knight Templar accused of embezzling taxes collected in the Saladin tithe of 1188. He was severely punished by his contemporary Master.

In 1200, Pope Innocent III issued a papal bull declaring the immunity of persons and goods within the houses of the Knights Templar from local laws. This ensured that the New Temple became a royal treasury as well as the repository for the order's accumulated revenues. These financial resources provided the basis for the development of the Templar's local banking facilities.

King Richard I (1189–1199) confirmed the Templars' land holdings and granted them immunity from all pleas, suits danegeld and from murdrum and latrocinium.

King John (1199–1216) had substantial financial dealings with the Knights Templar. At the time of Runnymede, not only was Aymeric de St Maur present, but King John was also resident at the Temple when the Barons first presented their demands. He awarded them the island of Lundy as well as land at Huntspill, Cameley, Harewood, Radnage and Northampton.

King Henry III (1207–1272) also had substantial dealing with Templars, the king's Wardrobe being located there in 1225. He entrusted Templar knights with military, financial and diplomatic commissions, and even considered being buried in the Temple. He did in fact establish a chantry there in 1231.

The first Templar House in England was in London.  Early patrons included Robert de Ferrers, 2nd Earl of Derby, Bernard de Balliol, King Stephen of England and Queen Matilda.

Persecution and dissolution

King Edward I (1239–1307) had accorded the Knights Templar a slighter role in public affairs, financial issues often being handled by Italian merchants and diplomacy by mendicant orders. Indeed, Edward I raided the treasury in 1283.

When Philip IV, King of France suppressed the order in 1307, King Edward II of England at first refused to believe the accusations. But after the intercession of Pope Clement V, King Edward ordered the seizure of members of the order in England on 8 January 1308. Only handfuls of Templars were duly arrested, however. Their trial ran from 22 October 1309 until 18 March 1310 in front of Deodatus, Abbot of Lagny and Sicard de Vaur. Most of the Templars acknowledged their belief that the Order's Master could give absolution was heretical, and were then reconciled with the church. However, Willian de la More refused to do so and remained a prisoner in the Tower of London until his death.

In 1312, under further pressure from King Philip IV of France, Pope Clement V officially disbanded the Order at the Council of Vienne. In 1314, the remaining Templar leaders in France were executed, some by being burned at the stake.  Clement issued a papal bull which granted the lands of the Templars to the Knights Hospitaller, but this was ignored until 1324. Starting in 1347, the priests started letting (renting) part of the Temple to lawyers, from which the evolution of the Inner Temple and Middle Temple as Inns of Court derives.

Templar Survival in England

Between 13 October 1307 and 8 January 1308, the Templars went unmolested in England. During this period many fugitive Templars, seeking to escape torture and execution, fled to apparent safety there. But after repeated pressure from Philip IV and Clement V on Edward II, a few half-hearted arrests were made. During a trial running from 22 October 1309 until 18 March 1310 most of the arrested Templars were forced to acknowledge the belief that the Order's Master could give absolution was heretical, and were officially reconciled with the church, many entering more conventional monastic Orders.

Most Templars in England were never arrested, and the persecution of their leaders was brief.  The order was dissolved due to damaged reputation, but given the pope and church's judgement of the order as free from guilt, all members in England were free to find themselves a new place in society.  Templar lands and assets were given to the Order of the Hospital of Saint John, a sister military order—though the English crown held onto some assets until 1338.  The largest portion of former Templars joined the Hospitallers, while other remaining members joined the Cistercian order, or lived on pension as lay members of society.  The loss of the Holy Land as a base for war against the Muslims had removed the primary reason for Templar existence, and the dissolved order now faded into history, in England as well as the rest of Europe.

The Templars in Hertfordshire

Baldock in Hertfordshire was established by the Knights Templar  and between 1199 and 1254 it was their English headquarters. The Hertford Mercury newspaper reported a warren of Templar tunnels beneath the town of Hertford, centering on Hertford Castle, where in 1309 four Templars from Temple Dinsley near Hitchin were imprisoned after their arrest by Edward II, who believed that they were holding a lost treasure.

Royston Cave in Hertfordshire

Modern tradition has it that after the persecution began the Templars were forced to meet in caves, tunnels and cellars in Hertfordshire and elsewhere in southeast England.  However, the brief and modest persecution in England is unlikely to have necessitated this, as remaining members could, even around 1310, met at the house or room of a friend not under arrest—which would have been most Templars.

But after lying undiscovered for at least 300 years, workmen accidentally stumbled upon Royston Cave (August 1742), hidden under a heavy millstone and a covering of soil. The cave's discovery created much excitement. Today, it still awes and inspires visitors who can see carvings depicting, among other images, knights, Saint George and Saint Catherine of Alexandria. Before the brief persecution, the Templars, assuming the cave was theirs, had no reason to hide below the ground, and they had wealth and access to stonemasons if they required religious carvings.  It is thus suggested by storytellers and a few historians that Royston Cave is evidence 'fugitive' Templars continued to meet and worship in secret after the disbandment.

There have been some highly questionable claims made about Royston Cave and its history, including the suggestion that its Templar builders may, in effect, have been early Freemasons.  However, no evidence of this link has been produced at this time.

The Templars in Rochester

Much of Strood, Kent was a royal manor until Henry II gave it to the Knights Templar around 1159. The Templars had assembled a range of buildings in Strood by 1185, which included a timber hall, barns, kitchens and stables. The stone building, which has survived to the present day, was added around 1240. It consists of a vaulted undercroft supporting a large, undivided first-floor hall, approached by an external staircase. This was probably a part of the range of facilities designed for the temporary accommodation of travelling Templar dignitaries.

Over the years, this hall was altered and enlarged as it passed through the hands of a number of owners. Many additions have been lost but two fine, 17th century brick extensions can still be seen today. These and the massive internal chimney were built by the Blake family, perhaps the richest in Strood at that time.

The estate was inevitably sold off bit by bit until the City of Rochester acquired what was left and decided to use the site for industrial development. The debate over the future of the house was interrupted by a gentleman named Mr. Willis (a local councillor) in 1913 just 2 weeks after purchasing an 8.4 acre (3.4 hectare) plot of land directly East across the River Medway for a facility of what was to become known as the Seaplane Works. It was not until 1951 that work began to save the building and preserve it in the condition in which it can be seen today.

Templar legacy
Nearly any site in England which uses the name "Temple," can probably be traced to Templar origins.

The Temple Church still stands on the site of the old Preceptory in London, and effigies of Crusading Templars can still be seen there today. The land was later rented to lawyers who use it today as Inner Temple and Middle Temple.

Modern Templar organisations in England
Several modern organisations claim links with the medieval Templars. Some, such as the Sovereign Military Order of the Temple of Jerusalem (SMOTJ), also known as the "Ordo Supremus Militaris Templi Hierosolymitani" (OSMTH), have attained United Nations NGO (Non-Governmental Organisation) status.  The SMOTJ admits that their group was founded in 1804, "based on the traditions" of the medieval order, which legacy they use to promote humanitarian causes.  However, there is often public confusion about the gap in time between the 14th century dismantling of the medieval Templars, and the 19th century rise of more contemporary organisations.

According to a 2004 article in The Times, one modern group in Hertfordshire (not affiliated to OSMTH) claims that although the medieval order officially ceased to exist in the early 14th century, that the majority of the organisation survived underground. There is, however, no verifiable evidence to support this claim. The Times article states that the group has written to the Vatican, asking for an official apology for the medieval persecution of the Templars. In Rome in 2004, a Vatican spokesman said that the demand for an apology would be given "serious consideration". However, Vatican insiders said that Pope John Paul II, 84 at the time, was under pressure from conservative cardinals to "stop saying sorry" for the errors of the past, after a series of papal apologies for the Crusades, the Inquisition, Christian anti-Semitism and the persecution of scientists and "heretics" such as Galileo.

Templar locations in England

Churches

 Bisham Abbey, Berkshire
 All Saints Church, Claverley, Shropshire
 Temple Church, Bristol
 Temple Church, London
 The Holy Sepulchre, Cambridge, Cambridgeshire (The Round Church in Cambridge)
 Garway Church, Herefordshire (Templar church with carvings and part of original round church excavated and fully visible)
 Cressing Temple, Essex
 Temple Balsall & Church, Warwickshire
 Temple Church, Cornwall
 Temple Ewell & Church, Kent
 Rothley Temple (Rothley Preceptory), Rothley, Leicestershire
 St. Mary's Church, Baldock, Hertfordshire.
 St Mary's Church, Shipley, West Sussex
 St. Mary's House, Bramber, West Sussex
 St. Mary's church, Sompting, West Sussex
 Poling Church, Poling, West Sussex
 Templar Church, Dover, on the Dover Western Heights, discovered in 1806 during construction of the fortifications there, according to Matthew Paris the site of King John's submission to the papal legate Pandulph in May 1213

Place names
 Temple Bruer, Lincolnshire, village and Templar ruins
 Temple Dinsley, Hertfordshire (now the village of Preston)
 Templecombe, near Sherborne
 Temple Mills (a post-industrial part of Stratford, London, incorporated into the 2012 Summer Olympics)
 Bristol City centre is rich in Templar place names and history such as Bristol Temple Meads railway station, Temple Bridge, Temple Gate, Temple Street...
 Temple Cloud, Somerset
 Temple Newsam, Leeds
 Temple Sowerby, Cumbria
 Temple Hirst, Yorkshire
 Temple Normanton, Derbyshire

Other locations
 Royston Cave, Hertfordshire.  It lies beneath the crossroads of the ancient Icknield Way and Ermine Street.
 Baldock, Hertfordshire (a town founded by the Templars)
 South Witham, Lincolnshire. The only full, preserved, knights templar preceptory within the whole of Europe.
 Denny Abbey, Cambridgeshire. Preceptory of the Knights Templars from 1169.

Masters of the Temple, London
 Richard de Hastyngs,           1160
 Richard Mallebeench,
 Geoffrey Fitz Stephen,         1180 to 1185
 William de Newenham,
 Thomas Bérard,                 1200
 Aymeric de St. Maur,           1200,1205 and 1228
 Alan Marcell,                  1220 and 1228
 Amberaldus,                    1229
 Robert Mounford,                   1234
 Robert Saunforde,                  1231 to 1247
 Rocelin de Fosse,                  1250 to 1253
 Amadeus de Morestello,             1254 to 1259
 Humbert de Pairaud,            1267 to 1269
 William de Beaulieu,               1274
 Robert Turvile,                    1277 to 1289
 Guy de Foresta,                    1290 to 1294
 Jaques de Molay,               1297
 Brian de Jay,                      1298
 William de la More,                1298 to 1307
 Philip Gregory,

Notes

Sources

 Evelyn Lord, Knights Templar in Britain, Longman, 2004. 
 Helen Nicholson, The Knights Templar, Sutton Publishing, 2004. 
 British Academy, London / Periodicals Service Co, Records of the Templars in England in the Twelfth Century: The Inquest of 1185 With Illustrative Charters and Documents: 009 (British Academy, London, Re), Periodicals Service Co, 1991. 
 
 The Closed Rolls of Henry II
 George Smart, The Knights Templar: Chronology, Authorhouse, 2005. 
 Malcolm Barber, The New Knighthood: A History of the Order of the Temple. Cambridge University Press, 1994. 
 Moses W. Redding, The Persecution and Martyrdom of Knights Templars in England, 
 Sylvia P. Beamon, The Royston Cave: Used by Saints or Sinners?, Cortney Publications, 1992. 
 F. M Page, History of Hertford, Hertford Town Council, 1993.

Further reading
 BBC Website 'What are the Knights Templar up to now?'. News Magazine 2007-10-19
 BBC Radio 4 ' On the Trail of The Templars' Program audio, first broadcast 2007-06-18
 Leeds Local History - On the trail of the Templars ''
 Baldock History 'The Knights Templars in Baldock'.

External links
 The Official Website of the Grand Priory of Knights Templar in England and Wales, affiliated to OSMTH 
 The Official Website of the English Grand Priory, affiliated to the CMOKT 

Crusades
Christianity in medieval England
Knights Templar